The Palace of Marqués de Grimaldi (Spanish: Palacio del Marqués de Grimaldi) is a palace located in Madrid, Spain. It was declared Bien de Interés Cultural in 2000.

History 
Also called the Godoy Palace (Spanish : Palacio de Godoy), it is a stately residence located in Madrid (Spain). It is located in the central street of Bailén, almost in front of the Royal Palace and next to the Senate. It was designed by Francisco Sabatini and carried out during the years 1776 and 1782. Occupied for a few years by Manuel Godoy, at present the palace is the headquarters of the Center for Political and Constitutional Studies, dependent on the Ministry of the Presidency of the Government of Spain.

The building was designed by Francisco Sabatini by order of Carlos III, who wanted to build a dignified residence for his secretary of state, the Marquis de Grimaldi, in the surroundings of the Royal Palace. The new palace was built between 1776 and 1782 in the space located between the Colegio de Doña María de Aragón (current Senate) and the planned Calle Nueva (current Calle Bailén). Sabatini used stone and brick, combining these materials in the style of other monuments that he had designed in the capital, such as the Royal Customs House. Despite giving the building the popular name, the Marquis de Grimaldi was not the first to inhabit the Palace of the Secretaries of State, but his successor, the Count of Floridablanca in 1782.

During the Second Republic, it was proposed to establish the Museum of Popular Art and the Museum of Cars (the royal carriages from the demolished Royal Stables) in the vicinity of the Royal Palace. To this end, in 1934 the architect Luis Moya Blanco devised a new wing, annexed to the Almirantazgo Palace, which extended almost to Calle del Río and with a new and monumental main facade facing Calle Bailén. None of this took place.

Finally, from 1941 to 1943 it was renovated to house the Museum of the Spanish People, it was then that the current façade facing Bailén Street was erected. The museum, however, was only open briefly from 1971 to 1973, when works in the neighboring National Council of the Movement (now the Senate) forced its transfer. Since 1975, the palace has housed the Centre for Political and Constitutional Studies.

During some works in 2019, buried remains of the basements of the demolished part of the palace appeared, in a magnificent state of conservation.

References

External links 
 Palace of Marqués de Grimaldi

Buildings and structures in Palacio neighborhood, Madrid
Bien de Interés Cultural landmarks in Madrid